Rustai-ye Taleqani may refer to:
 Rustai-ye Taleqani, Fars
 Rustai-ye Taleqani, Kerman